Pedernales may refer to:

Geography
Salar de Pedernales, Chile
Pedernales Province, Dominican Republic
Pedernales, Dominican Republic, its capital
Pedernales Canton, Manabí Province, Ecuador
Pedernales, Ecuador, its capital
Pedernales, Vizcaya, Vizcaya, Spain
Pedernales River, Texas, United States
Pedernales Falls State Park, Texas, United States
Pedernales (Cabo Rojo), a barrio in Cabo Rojo, Puerto Rico
Pedernales, Delta Amacuro (Delta Amacuro State), Venezuela

Transport
 SS Pedernales, a tanker ship attacked by the German submarine U-156 in 1942, during World War II